Hwang Geum-hee (born August 20, 1977) is a South Korean actress. Previously known by her stage name Ji Sung-won, Hwang began using her real name professionally in August 2013. Her most notable work is the critically acclaimed horror film Bedevilled (2010).

Filmography

Film

Television series

Awards and nominations

References

External links
 
 
 
 

1977 births
Living people
South Korean television actresses
South Korean film actresses